The Augmenting Compatibility and Competition by Enabling Service Switching Act of 2021, or the ACCESS Act of 2021, is a proposed antitrust bill in the United States House of Representatives. The purpose of the legislation is to mandate data portability from Big Tech companies to provide users the ability to switch their data between platforms.

The legislation was introduced on June 11, 2021, by Mary Gay Scanlon (D-PA) with support from Democrats David Cicilline (D-RI) and Jerry Nadler (D-NY) and Republicans Ken Buck (R-CO) and Burgess Owens (R-UT).

History 
In the 116th Congress session, a similar bill with the same name was introduced in the Senate by Mark Warner (D-VA) and Josh Hawley (R-MO). On May 25, 2022, Warner and Hawley introduced companion legislation in the Senate for the 117th United States Congress.

Provisions 
Proponents of the legislation argue that platforms that prohibit user data from being portable to another platform are engaging in anti-competitive behavior against competitors. The legislation defines user data as any information a covered platform collects unique to an individual or their device. Covered platforms subject to these regulations are those with over 100 million monthly active users.

The legislation creates a Technical Committee within the Federal Trade Commission (FTC) that will be tasked with developing standards for interoperability and online data portability. The legislation grants the FTC enforcement authority to penalize platforms that violate the legislation.

Voting summary 
On June 23, 2021, the House Committee on the Judiciary voted to advance the legislation to the House floor in a 29–19 vote.

Legislative History

See also 

 American Innovation and Choice Online Act 
 General Data Protection Regulation
 Merger Filing Fee Modernization Act of 2021
 Open App Markets Act
 State Antitrust Enforcement Venue Act of 2021

References 

United States antitrust law
Proposed legislation of the 117th United States Congress
United States proposed federal antitrust legislation